Asma Houli (born 30 December 1976), is an Algerian chess player and African Women's Chess Championship winner (2001).

Biography
In 2001, in Cairo won African Women's Chess Championship. In 2003, in Abuja ranked 3rd in African Women's Chess Championship. In 2003, played for Algeria in All-Africa Games chess tournament and won team and individual gold medals.

In 2000s Asma Houli participated in Women's World Chess Championship by knock-out system:
 In Women's World Chess Championship 2000 in the first round lost to Rakhil Eidelson,
 In Women's World Chess Championship 2001 in the first round lost to Maia Chiburdanidze,
 In Women's World Chess Championship 2004 in the first round lost to Svetlana Matveeva.

Asma Houli played for Algeria in the Women's Chess Olympiads:
 In 1992, at third board in the 30th Chess Olympiad (women) in Manila (+5, =2, -7),
 In 2002, at second board in the 35th Chess Olympiad (women) in Bled (+4, =5, -4).

References

External links
 
 
 Asma Houli chess games at 365Chess.com

1976 births
Living people
Algerian female chess players
Chess Olympiad competitors
African Games medalists in chess
Competitors at the 2003 All-Africa Games
African Games gold medalists for Algeria
21st-century Algerian women
20th-century Algerian women